Tân Uyên may refer to several places in Vietnam, including:

Tân Uyên, Bình Dương, a district-level town of Bình Dương Province
Tân Uyên District, Lai Châu, a rural district of Bình Dương